The Mark's bushfrog (Raorchestes marki) is a critically endangered frog found only in the Nelliampathi Hills within the Western Ghats of Kerala, India. The species is named after Mark Wilkinson of the Natural History Museum, London.

Raorchestes marki are small, slender-bodied frogs. Males measure  in snout–vent length and females . The dorsum is dark grey and has a brownish concave stripe running from behind the eye.

References

External links

 

marki
Endemic fauna of the Western Ghats
Frogs of India
Amphibians described in 2009
Taxa named by Sathyabhama Das Biju